Dermatophyton is a genus of green algae, in the family Pithophoraceae.

References

External links

Cladophorales genera
Pithophoraceae